The Global Academy is a University Technical College located on The Old Vinyl Factory site in Hayes, London.

The UTC opened in September 2016 and is sponsored by the media and entertainment group Global and by University of the Arts London.

In its first year, 100 students started in Year 10 and 100 in Year 12. In its second year, 150 students started in Year 10 and 75 in Year 12. The Academy will eventually have 800 students.

On 20 April 2017, the Academy was officially opened by the Duke of Cambridge and Prince Harry in their capacity as patrons of "Heads Together", a mental health charity. Two breakfast shows from Global radio stations were broadcasting live from the Academy: Heart London Breakfast with Jamie Theakston, and Emma Bunton and Nick Ferrari on LBC.

The academy has an online student radio station and TV channel, Youths Choice.

References

External links

2016 establishments in England
Educational institutions established in 2016
University Technical Colleges in London
Secondary schools in the London Borough of Hillingdon
University of the Arts London
Global Media & Entertainment